Harttia carvalhoi is a species of armored catfish endemic to Brazil where it is found in the Paraíba do Sul drainage basin. This species grows to a length of  SL.

The fish is named in honor of Brazilian ichthyologist-herpetologist Antenor Leitão de Carvalho (1910-1985), who collected the type specimen.

References
 

carvalhoi
Fish of South America
Fish of Brazil
Endemic fauna of Brazil
Taxa named by Paulo de Miranda-Ribeiro
Fish described in 1939